North Brighton is a suburb of Adelaide in South Australia. The northern reaches of the suburb are occupied by Brighton Secondary School and the campus of Minda Inc, a large disability support organisation. To the south, the suburb is bounded by the Townsend Park Retirement Village and Marymount College. Other points of interest are a small shopping centre on the corner of Holder and Brighton Roads, and North Brighton Beach.

References

Suburbs of Adelaide